Koskinen Stadium is a 4,500-seat (7,000-capacity) stadium in Durham, North Carolina on the campus of Duke University. It serves as home to Duke's soccer and lacrosse teams.

The stadium is named in honor of Duke benefactors John Koskinen and Patricia Koskinen.

See also
Duke Blue Devils men's lacrosse

References

External links
 Duke Athletics - Koskinen Stadium

College lacrosse venues in the United States
College soccer venues in the United States
Duke Blue Devils soccer
Lacrosse venues in North Carolina
Soccer venues in North Carolina
Sports venues in Durham, North Carolina
Duke Blue Devils sports venues
Duke Blue Devils lacrosse